Loreto is an interchange subway station serving Lines 1 and 2 of the Milan Metro. The Line 1 station was opened on 1 November 1964 as part of the inaugural section of the Metro, between Sesto Marelli and Lotto. The Line 2 station was opened on 27 September 1969 as part of the section between Cascina Gobba and Caiazzo.

The station is located at Piazzale Loreto within the municipal area of Milan. It is a very busy station. This is an underground station, with two tracks in a single tunnel for Line 1 over two tracks in one tunnel for Line 2.

References

Line 1 (Milan Metro) stations
Line 2 (Milan Metro) stations
Railway stations opened in 1964
1964 establishments in Italy
Railway stations in Italy opened in the 20th century

ja:カドルナ駅